Ali Hoseyna may refer to:
 Ali Hoseyna, Sistan and Baluchestan
 Ali Hoseyna, Yazd